
Chrzanów County is a unit of territorial administration and local government (powiat) in Lesser Poland Voivodeship, southern Poland. It came into being on January 1, 1999, as a result of the Polish local government reforms passed in 1998.

As of 2019 its total population is 124,937, out of which the population of Chrzanów is 36,717, that of Trzebinia is 19,778, that of Libiąż is 17,017, that of Alwernia is 3,368, and the rural population is 40,778.

Neighbouring counties
Chrzanów County is bordered by Olkusz County to the north-east, Kraków County to the east, Wadowice County to the south, Oświęcim County to the south-west and the city of Jaworzno to the west.

Administrative division
The county is subdivided into five gminas (four urban-rural and one rural). These are listed in the following table, in descending order of population.

References

 
Land counties of Lesser Poland Voivodeship